In anatomy a fossa (plural fossae ( or ); from Latin fossa, "ditch" or "trench") is a depression or hollow usually in a bone, such as the hypophyseal fossa (the depression in the sphenoid bone). Some examples include:

In the Skull:
 Cranial fossa
 Anterior cranial fossa
 Middle cranial fossa
 Interpeduncular fossa
 Posterior cranial fossa
 Hypophyseal fossa
 Temporal bone fossa
 Mandibular fossa
 Jugular fossa
 Infratemporal fossa
 Pterygopalatine fossa
 Pterygoid fossa
 Lacrimal fossa
 Fossa for lacrimal gland
 Fossa for lacrimal sac
 Mandibular fossa
 Scaphoid fossa
 Jugular fossa
 Condyloid fossa
 Rhomboid fossa

In the Mandible:
 Retromolar fossa

In the Torso:
 Fossa ovalis (heart)
 Infraclavicular fossa
Pyriform fossa
 Substernal fossa
 Iliac fossa
 Ovarian fossa
 Paravesical fossa
 Coccygeal fossa
 Fossa navicularis
 Navicular fossa of male urethra
 Fossa of vestibule of vagina
 Ischioanal fossa

In the Upper Limb:
 Supraclavicular fossa
 Radial fossa
 On the scapula:
 Glenoid fossa
 Supraspinous fossa
 Infraspinous fossa
 Subscapular fossa
 Cubital fossa (a.k.a. Antecubital fossa)
 Olecranon fossa

In the Lower Limb:
 Fossa ovalis (thigh)
 Trochanteric fossa
 Acetabular fossa
 Popliteal fossa
 Intercondyloid fossa
 Anterior intercondyloid fossa
 Posterior intercondyloid fossa
 Intercondylar fossa of femur

See also
 Foramen

References